The Order of Friendship is a state decoration of the Russian Federation established by Boris Yeltsin by presidential decree 442 of 2 March 1994 to reward Russian and foreign nationals whose work, deeds and efforts have been aimed at the betterment of relations with the Russian Federation and its people. The design of order was created by Alexander Zhuk. Its statute was later amended by presidential decree 19 of 6 January 1999, presidential decree 1999 of 7 September 2010, presidential decree 1631 of 16 December 2011, and presidential decree 308 of 16 March 2012. It can trace its lineage to the Soviet Order of Friendship of Peoples, also designed by Alexander Zhuk.

The Order of Friendship is the direct successor of the Soviet-era Order of Friendship of Peoples.

Award statute 
The Order of Friendship is awarded to Russian and foreign nationals for special merit in strengthening peace, friendship, cooperation and understanding between nations, for fruitful work on the convergence and mutual enrichment of cultures of nations and peoples; for the active conservation, development and promotion of the cultural and historical heritage of Russia; for great contribution to the implementation of joint ventures with the Russian Federation, major economic projects and attracting investments into the economy of the Russian Federation; for broad charitable activities.

Award description 
The badge of the Order of Friendship is made of gilded silver and enamels. It is a pentagonal star created from diverging golden rays. On the obverse at the center of the star is a terrestrial globe, with the oceans covered in blue enamel. The globe is surrounded by a green enamelled wreath of olive branches. On the reverse is the inscription "Peace and Friendship" and the etched serial number of the individual award. The distance between opposite tips of the star is 44 mm.

The badge of the order is connected by a ring through the suspension loop to a standard Russian pentagonal mount covered with an overlapping 24 mm wide green silk moiré ribbon with 6 mm wide light blue stripes along its edges. When worn in the presence of other Orders and medals of the Russian Federation, the Order of Friendship is located immediately after the Order of Honour.

Notable recipients (partial list) 
The following individuals were awarded the Order of Friendship:
Prince Aimone, Duke of Aosta
Mahathir Mohamad, Malaysian 4th and 7th Prime Minister
Adelina Sotnikova, a Russian competitive figure skater
Evgenia Medvedeva, a Russian competitive figure skater
Kamila Valieva, a Russian competitive figure skater
Sopubek Begaliev, Kyrgyz politician (Kyrgyzstan)
Lydia T. Black, a historian and anthropologist in the field of Russian America (US)
George Blake, double agent (UK)
David Blatt, basketball coach (Israel/US)
 William Craft Brumfield, historian, preservationist and photographer (US)
 The Right Honourable Jean Chrétien, PC, OM, CC, KC, former Prime Minister of Canada
Dimitris Christofias, President of Cyprus
Adrienne Clarkson, Governor General of Canada (renounced the Order)
Ahmad Afandi Abdulaev, Mufti of Dagestan
Van Cliburn, renowned pianist (US)
Bernie Ecclestone, British business magnate
Patricia Cloherty, entrepreneur and businesswoman (US)
Frank De Winne, ESA astronaut and head of the European Astronaut Centre (Belgium)
Milorad Dodik, President of the Republika Srpska
Maurice Druon, writer (France)
Yuli Gusman, film director (Azerbaijan)
Nadey Hakim (2021)
Eero Heinäluoma, Deputy Prime Minister of Finland, threw the award away after the 2022 Russian invasion of Ukraine
Ignatius IV of Antioch (Hazim), patriarch of the Greek Orthodox Christian Church
Prince Dimitri Romanov, claimant to headship of the Imperial House of Russia
Victor Hochhauser, British music promoter
Gleb Ivashentsov (2003)
Hun Sen, Prime Minister of Cambodia 
Gianni Infantino, president of FIFA.
Daisaku Ikeda, president of Soka Gakkai International (Japan)
Jayakanthan, Tamil writer (India), 2011
Akhmad Kadyrov, President of Chechnya
Moshe Kantor, president of the European Jewish Congress
Anatoly Karpov, chess player, for his great contribution to strengthening peace and friendship between peoples and productive social activities
 Roman Abramovich, owner of Chelsea F.C
Prince Michael of Kent, cousin of Queen Elizabeth II and descendant of Tsar Alexander II of Russia; a qualified interpreter of Russian (UK). He returned the honour in the aftermath of the 2022 Russian invasion of Ukraine.
Vakhtang Kikabidze, singer and actor (the award was rejected by Kikabidze in August 2008) (Georgia)
Emir Kusturica, Serbian filmmaker, actor and musician
André Kuipers, ESA astronaut (Netherlands)
Christine Lagarde, President of the European Central Bank and former Managing Director of the IMF (France)
Lee Kuan Yew, Minister Mentor of Singapore
Valery Leontiev, pop singer
Yulia Lipnitskaya, figure skater, received award for outstanding performance at the 2014 Sochi Winter Olympics
Antonio Mennini, Apostolic Nuncio to Russia (2002–2010) for his contribution to the development of Russian-Vatican relations (Vatican)
Ralph Munro (1998)
Aliya Mustafina, Olympic gold medalist in gymnastics
Riccardo Muti, conductor (Italy)
Oscar Niemeyer, renowned architect (Brazil)
God Nisanov, billionaire property developer
Sagadat Nurmagambetov, Defense Minister of Kazakhstan
Constantine Orbelian, conductor and pianist, 2012 Medal Recipient
Richard Pierce, a historian of Russian-American studies (US)
A. Sivathanu Pillai, BrahMos chief (India)
Marcel Prud'homme, Senator (Canada)
Grigory Rodchenkov, director of Russia's national antidoping laboratory who later defected and exposed Russian doping system (awarded prior to the scandal)
Jacques Rogge, 8th President of the International Olympic Committee (Belgium)
Buvaisar Saitiev, three-time Olympic gold medal wrestler
Vladimir Sangi, Nivkh author, publicist, and language activist
Ekaterina Semenikhin, honorary consul of Russia in Monaco
Mrinal Sen, film director (India)
Dimitris Sioufas, legislator (Greece)
Dario Salas Sommer, Chilean philosopher
James W. Symington, a former member of the U.S. House of Representatives and current attorney at Nossaman LLP/O'Connor & Hannan (US)
Rex Tillerson, U.S. Secretary of State under President Donald Trump, and former CEO of ExxonMobil
Mari Törőcsik, Hungarian actress
Andrzej Wajda, film director (Poland)
Rowan Williams, Archbishop of Canterbury, recognised for contributions to friendly relations between Russia and the UK, and his love of Russian literature (UK)
Tatjana Ždanoka, politician (Latvia)
Ban Ki-moon, eighth secretary-general of the United Nations
Xavier Rolet , CEO London Stock Exchange Group
Valentina Tereshkova, the first woman in space
Alina Zagitova, a Russia competitive figure skater
Kassym-Jomart Tokayev, President of Kazakhstan
Mehriban Aliyeva, First Vice-President of Azerbaijan
Megawati Sukarnoputri, 5th President of Indonesia
Alexander (Ishein), Archbishop of Baku and Azerbaijan from 1999 to 2021
Péter Szijjártó Hungarian politician, Minister of Foreign Affairs and Trade, awarded in December 2021
Boris Dobrodeev, screenwriter
Maria Zakharova, Director of the Information and Press Department of the Ministry of Foreign Affairs of the Russian Federation
Vija Artmane, actor
Patriarch Theodore II of Alexandria, Patriarch of the Greek Orthodox Patriarchate of Alexandria for his great contribution to the development of cooperation between the Russian Federation and the Arab Republic of Egypt, awarded in September 2009
Steven Seagal

See also
Order of Friendship of Peoples (Soviet Union)
Awards and decorations of the Russian Federation

References

External links

The Commission on State Awards to the President of the Russian Federation 
The Russian Gazette 

Civil awards and decorations of Russia
Orders, decorations, and medals of Russia
Russian awards
Awards established in 1994
1994 establishments in Russia